Suomi-marssi ( 'Finland March') is a Finnish military march composed in 1837 by Vääpeli Erik Wilhelm Eriksson of Kaartin Soittokunta. The march is also known as Marsch aus Petersburg or Petersburger Marsch. The Finnish Guard Jaeger Regiment uses it as a parade march.

History 
The march was first played in 1837 when the Finnish Guards' Rifle Battalion was practicing with the Russian Imperial Guard in Krasnoye Selo. Nicholas I gifted the march to Frederick William III of Prussia. The march was included in the official list of marches of the Prussian Army with the name "Marsch aus Petersburg". The march is still used by the Bundeswehr and by the Finnish Armed Forces.

References 

Finnish military marches
1837 compositions